Teeny Tiny Stevies are an ARIA Award-winning Australian children's music group established in 2015 by sisters Bethany 'Beth' and Sibylla 'Byll' Stephen. The Stephen sisters also perform as the indie folk band The Little Stevies.

Biography
In 2015, Beth Stephen and Byll Stephen started writing children's songs. Prompted by Byll Stephen's experience with her three-year-old child, the pair wrote a song about the challenges of toilet training before writing and recording a full-length album.

Teeny Tiny Stevies' debut album Useful Songs for Little People was offered to the public through The Little Stevies’ website and featured the songs "I Ate a Rainbow" and "Family (Love Is Love)". One of the tracks from the album, "Baby in Mum's Tummy", was a finalist in the International Songwriting Competition 

After performing at shows and festivals, the band's second album, Helpful Songs For Little People, was released in February 2018 by ABC Kids, and was nominated for the ARIA Award for Best Children's Album. The album features the singles "Boss of My Own Body" and "Boy Or Girl Colour".

In April 2020, the band shared a new song on social media, called "Stay Home", which helped explain the COVID-19 Pandemic to children.

Teeny Tiny Stevies' third studio album, Thoughtful Songs for Little People was released August 2020, featuring the singles "Had You to Teach Me", "Superpower" and "Good for Your Health". The album won the 2020 ARIA Award for Best Children's Album, and also won the Best Children's Album at the 2021 AIR Independent Music Awards.

Animated Music Videos
Teeny Tiny Stevies' music videos, animated by illustrator Simon Howe, are broadcast regularly on ABC Kids TV. 

Sesame Studios produced a video for the song 'By My Side'.

Discography

Albums

Awards and nominations

AIR Awards
The Australian Independent Record Awards (known colloquially as the AIR Awards) is an annual awards night to recognise, promote and celebrate the success of Australia's Independent Music sector.

! 
|-
| 2021
| Thoughtful Songs for Little People
| Best Independent Children's Album or EP
| 
| 
|}

ARIA Music Awards
The ARIA Music Awards is an annual awards ceremony that recognises excellence, innovation, and achievement across all genres of Australian music.

! 
|-
|-
|2018
|Helpful Songs for Little People
| rowspan="3" |Best Children's Album
|
|
|-
| 2020
| Thoughtful Songs for Little People
| 
|
|-
| 2022
| How to Be Creative
| 
| 
|-

References

External links
 Official website

Australian children's musical groups
Australian musical duos
Musical groups established in 2015
Australian Broadcasting Corporation original programming
Australian children's television series
ARIA Award winners
2015 establishments in Australia